Masłowice Trzebiatkowskie  (Cashubian Trzebiôtkòwsczé Masłowice) is a village in the administrative district of Gmina Tuchomie, within Bytów County, Pomeranian Voivodeship, in northern Poland.

The village has a population of 60.

References

Villages in Bytów County